The Women's 500m Time Trial is one of the 9 women's events at the 2010 UCI Track Cycling World Championships, held in Ballerup, Denmark.

21 Cyclists from 15 countries participated in the contest. The Final was held on 24 March.

World record

Final

References

Results

Women's 500 m time trial
UCI Track Cycling World Championships – Women's 500 m time trial